506 was a common year starting on Sunday of the Julian calendar.

506 may also refer to:

 506 (number)
 506 Carlton, streetcar (tram) line run by the Toronto Transit Commission in Toronto, Canada
 Area code 506, telephone area code in the Canadian province of New Brunswick